Bāṣkali (Bashkali) also known as Bahkali or Bahkala, was one of the arrangers of the Vedas. Paila divided the Rig Veda, and gave the two Sanhitas, or collections of hymns, to Indrapramati and to Bāṣkali.

References

Further sources
Vedabase
Academia.edu - Rig Veda

Vedas
People in Hindu mythology